Splitting Up Together is an American sitcom developed by Emily Kapnek that aired on ABC from March 27, 2018, to April 9, 2019. The series stars Jenna Fischer, Oliver Hudson, Bobby Lee, Diane Farr, Lindsay Price, Olivia Keville, Van Crosby, and Sander Thomas.

On May 10, 2019, ABC cancelled the series after two seasons.

Premise 
The series chronicles what happens when a couple's marriage is suddenly reignited by their divorce. The couple has three children who live in the house with one parent on alternating weeks while the other parent lives as a single person who stays in the garage apartment in the back of the house. The garage-dwelling "single" partner is free to date while having no responsibilities in the house or for the children. The "parent" partner is free to preside over the house and family as they deem best. Each week the parents learn a little more about what it is they are lacking in the parenting and "romantic" parts of their lives, and in doing so become better parents and better romantic partners. Often the insight they gain allows them to see why their spouse felt unhappy in the marriage; thus helping them to improve as a person. This increasingly improved person they become also becomes slightly more alluring to their ex-spouse making their complete separation seem less likely.

Cast

Main 
 Jenna Fischer as Lena
 Oliver Hudson as Martin
 Bobby Lee as Arthur
 Diane Farr as Maya
 Lindsay Price as Camille
 Olivia Keville as Mae
 Van Crosby as Mason
 Sander Thomas as Milo

Recurring 
 Geoff Pierson as Henry
 Trent Garrett as Wes
 Monica Barbaro as Lisa Apple
 Kelsey Chow as Charlotte

Notable guest stars 
 Fred Armisen as Dr. Rydakto (episode: "Letting Ghost")
 Rowan Blanchard as China
 Angela Kinsey as Jeannie Johnson (episode: "We Need to Talk About Karen")

Production

Development 
On August 29, 2016, it was announced that ABC had picked up Splitting Up Together as a put pilot, a single-camera comedy series. Emily Kapnek, Ellen DeGeneres, Jeff Kleeman, Mett Heeno, Hella Joof, and Mia Andreasen serve as executive producers. On February 1, 2017, it was announced that ABC had officially ordered a pilot for the series. On April 5, 2017, it was revealed that the series would be a production of Warner Bros. Television. On May 12, 2017, it was announced that ABC had given Splitting Up Together a series order. On January 8, 2018, it was announced that the series would premiere on March 27, 2018. On May 11, 2018, it was announced that ABC had renewed the series for a second season. On July 24, 2018, it was announced that the second season would premiere on October 16, 2018. On October 22, 2018, it was announced that ABC had ordered three additional episodes for the second season. On November 7, 2018, it was announced that the series had received a full-season order for its second season.

Casting 
On February 28, 2017, it was announced that Jenna Fischer was cast in the series. On March 1, 2017, it was announced that Oliver Hudson was cast in the series. On March 6, 2017, it was announced that Diane Farr was cast in the series. On May 12, 2018, it was announced that Olivia Keville, Van Crosby, Sanders Combs, Bobby Lee, and Lindsay Price were cast in the series. On November 16, 2017, it was announced that Geoff Pierson would recur in the series. On August 28, 2018, it was announced that Costa Ronin would be joining the series. On September 28, 2018, it was announced that Angela Kinsey would appear in an episode of the series. On October 10, 2018, it was announced that Ali Larter would recur in the second season.

Filming 
The family home, and the couple's inability to sell it at the time of the divorce is central to the series. It is a Southern California craftsman style home, is featured in the title credits and in a number of episodes. The property’s actual interior was utilized in the pilot. However, most production occurs in a replica of that interior on a soundstage at the Warner Bros. Studio in Burbank.

Episodes

Series overview

Season 1 (2018)

Season 2 (2018–19)

Reception

Critical 
On the review aggregator website Rotten Tomatoes, the series has an approval rating of 38% based on 21 reviews, with an average rating of 5.71/10. Metacritic, which uses a weighted average, assigned a score of 54 out of 100 based on 9 critics, indicating "mixed or average reviews".

Ratings

Overall 
 
                      
| link2             = #Season 2 (2018–19)
| episodes2         = 18
| start2            = 
| end2              = 
| startrating2      = 3.29
| endrating2        = 2.50
| viewers2          = |2}} 
}}

Season 1

Season 2

References

External links 
 

2010s American single-camera sitcoms
2018 American television series debuts
2019 American television series endings
American Broadcasting Company original programming
American television series based on Danish television series
English-language television shows
Television series about couples
Television series about dysfunctional families
Television series by A Very Good Production
Television series by Warner Bros. Television Studios
Television series about divorce